Bathams is a brewery in Brierley Hill, West Midlands, England established in 1877 in a former slaughterhouse. The brewery is described by the CAMRA Good Beer Guide as "A classic Black country small brewery". It produces three cask conditioned beers, Best Bitter (4.3%), Mild (3.5%) and XXX (6.3%), a Christmas special. The Best Bitter won its highly contested class at the Great British Beer Festival in 1991. Bottled versions are also available at Bathams pubs.

The Brewery is currently run by brothers Tim and Matt Batham, having been in the Batham family for five generations. It is one of few breweries that still use 54-gallon hogshead casks.

Bathams owns twelve pubs in the Black Country and West Midlands:
The Britannia Inn, Sedgley, Dudley
The Bird in Hand, Oldswinford, Stourbridge
The Fox and Grapes, Pensnett, Brierley Hill
The Lamp Tavern, Dudley
The King Arthur, Hagley, Stourbridge
The New Inn, Wordsley
The Plough and Harrow, Kinver
The Plough Inn, Shenstone (near Kidderminster)
The Royal Exchange, Stourbridge
The Swan Inn, Chaddesley Corbett
The Unicorn, Wollaston, Stourbridge
The Vine, Brierley Hill.  The Home of Batham's Beer, also known as the Bull & Bladder.

References

External links

Breweries in England
British companies established in 1877
Food and drink companies established in 1877
Companies based in the West Midlands (county)
Brierley Hill